Franz Muxeneder (19 October 1920 - 3 January 1988) was an Austrian actor. He appeared in more than one hundred films from 1948 to 1987.

Muxeneder is best known in Great Britain for his part in the Yugoslav-German television series The White Horses (1966–1967).

Selected filmography

References

External links 

1920 births
1988 deaths
Austrian male film actors
Austrian male television actors
20th-century Austrian male actors